The Conference of the Birds is a 12th-century classic of Persian poetry written by Farid ud-Din Attar.

Conference of the Birds may also refer to:
 Conference of the Birds: The Story of Peter Brook in Africa (1977), John Heilpern's nonfiction account of the African tour of Peter Brook and his experimental theatre company
 Conference of the Birds (Dave Holland album) (1972)
 Conference of the Birds (Om album) (2006)
 Conference of the Birds (play), a music theatre play
 The Conference of the Birds (novel), the fifth novel of Miss Peregrine's peculiar children, by Ransom Riggs (2020)